The 1934 Butler Bulldogs football team was an American football team that represented Butler University as an member of the Indiana Intercollegiate Conference (IIC) during the 1934 college football season. In its third and final season under head coach Fred Mackey, the team compiled an overall record of 6–1–1 with a mark of 6–0–1 in conference play, winning the IIC title.

Schedule

References

Butler
Butler Bulldogs football seasons
Butler Bulldogs football